Christopher Jeffrey Richards (born March 28, 2000) is an American professional soccer player who plays as a centre-back for the  club Crystal Palace and the United States national team.

Club career

FC Dallas
Richards was raised in Hoover, Alabama, and played youth soccer for Hoover SC. In 2016, he was cut from a trial with FC Dallas Academy and instead joined Texans SC in Houston. He then joined FC Dallas Academy in 2017.

On April 12, 2018, he signed a professional contract with FC Dallas.

Bayern Munich
In May 2018, Richards, with his FC Dallas colleague Thomas Roberts, went to a 10-day trial at FC Bayern Munich as part of an agreement between the two clubs. As a result of his performance during the trial, in July he was offered a one-year loan with the German club.

On July 21, 2018, Richards debuted for the Bayern senior team at the 2018 International Champions Cup, replacing Sandro Wagner in the 62nd minute of the 3–1 win against Paris Saint-Germain F.C. During the 2018–19 season, he spent time with Bayern München U19s, becoming a team regular starter and being praised for his aerial abilities and his passing skills. On January 19, 2019, Richards signed a $1.5 million permanent contract with FC Bayern Munich. On August 19, 2019, he made his professional debut when he started for FC Bayern Munich II at the 3. Liga in a 2–1 away win against Hallescher FC. He made 30 appearances and scoring 4 goals for Bayern II in a team that won the 3. Liga.

On June 20, 2020, Richards made his Bundesliga debut in a 3–1 victory over Freiburg. On September 18, he made his first appearance of the 2020–21 Bundesliga season in Bayern's opening match against Schalke 04. He made his first start for Bayern against Hertha BSC on October 4, in which he assisted a Robert Lewandowski goal in the 51st minute of a 4–3 win.

On November 25, 2020, Richards made his UEFA Champions League debut for Bayern in a 3–1 victory over Red Bull Salzburg. He left the game in the 79th minute when he was replaced by Javi Martínez.

Loan to Hoffenheim
On February 1, 2021, Richards joined the Bundesliga side TSG 1899 Hoffenheim on loan for the remainder of the season.

Crystal Palace
Richards signed a five-year contract with Crystal Palace on July 27, 2022, after being transferred from Bayern Munich for a €12,000,000 fee.

International career
In January 2018, Richards was called for the MNT Youth National Team Summit Camp, which gathered 153 players from U16, U17, U18, U19 and U20 Youth National Teams. In May 2018, he made his debut for the United States U20 team in a match against Honduras. On November 12, 2018, Richards was called for the 2018 CONCACAF U-20 Championship as one of the three replacements allowed before the beginning of the "Qualification Stage". He, then, started in two of the tournament's three remaining matches, including the final, a 2–0 win, against Mexico. On May 10, 2019, he was included by the coach Tab Ramos in the 21-man squad called to represent the United States at the 2019 FIFA U-20 World Cup. Richards started all of the five matches that the Americans played in the tournament, including the 3–2 win against the heavy favorites, France. Richards played the entire game in all but one of the matches (that against Nigeria).

He received his first call up to the senior United States squad for matches against Wales and Panama in November 2020. He made his national team debut as a late substitute against Panama.

Personal life
Richards' father, Ken Richards, played college basketball at Birmingham–Southern College and later professionally in Australia, Bolivia and Iceland.

Career statistics

Club

International

Honors
Bayern Munich
UEFA Super Cup: 2020
DFL-Supercup: 2020, 2021

United States U20
CONCACAF U-20 Championship: 2018

Individual
IFFHS Men's World Youth (U20) Team: 2020

References

External links

 Profile at the Crystal Palace F.C. website
 
 
 Chris Richards at United States Soccer Federation
 Chris Richards at Major League Soccer

2000 births
Living people
Association football defenders
Soccer players from Birmingham, Alabama
American soccer players
American expatriate soccer players in Germany
American expatriate sportspeople in England
Expatriate footballers in England
United States men's youth international soccer players
United States men's under-20 international soccer players
United States men's international soccer players
FC Dallas players
FC Bayern Munich II players
FC Bayern Munich footballers
TSG 1899 Hoffenheim players
Crystal Palace F.C. players
3. Liga players
Bundesliga players
Premier League players
Homegrown Players (MLS)
African-American soccer players
21st-century African-American sportspeople
American expatriate soccer players
People from Hoover, Alabama